The National Democratic Institute (NDI), or National Democratic Institute for International Affairs, is a non-profit American NGO that works with partners in developing countries to increase the effectiveness of democratic institutions. The NDI's core program areas include citizen participation, elections, debates, democratic governance, democracy and technology, political inclusion of marginalized groups, and gender, women and democracy, peace and security, political parties, and youth political participation. The organization's stated mission is to "support and strengthen democratic institutions worldwide through citizen participation, openness and accountability in government."

The NDI was founded in 1983, shortly after the United States Congress created the National Endowment for Democracy (NED). The NED's creation was followed by the establishment of three related institutes: the Center for International Private Enterprise, the National Democratic Institute for International Affairs, and the National Republican Institute for International Affairs (later renamed the International Republican Institute). The NED provides funds to these three institutes and an expanding number of private sector groups so that they are able to carry out their programs abroad.

The NDI claims to be non-partisan and does not operate in the United States; it takes no position on U.S. elections, although it has a loose affiliation with the Democratic Party, and is a "cooperating organization" with the Liberal International.

Activity
The National Democratic Institute has worked in 156 countries and territories around the world and supported the efforts of 16,000 civic organizations, 925 political parties and organizations, 10,000 legislators, and 1,300 women's organizations. Furthermore, NDI has organized over 200 international election observer delegations in over 67 countries. Through its local partners, NDI has helped train and deploy 4 million election observers in 350 elections and referendums in 85 countries and has trained 600,000 party poll-watchers in more than 50 countries. It has helped partner groups organize 400 candidate debates in over 35 countries.

Chile
The NDI started its activities in Chile in 1985. Its programs promoted free elections, working together with opposition leaders. In 1988, it participated in the United States campaign for the No at the Chilean national plebiscite. The United States Congress budgeted this campaign with  that the National Endowment for Democracy distributed through the NDI, the National Republican Institute for International Affairs, Free Trade Union Institute, and the Center for International Private Enterprise. The NDI participated organizing seminaries, sending political consultants, and an election observation mission.

Nicaragua
In the 1980s, the NDI participated in the broader National Endowment for Democracy programs against the Nicaraguan Revolution.

Northern Ireland
In the 1980s, the NDI provided support to the Social Democratic and Labour Party in Northern Ireland to strengthen its democratic principles.

Ukraine 
In the 2000's, NDI worked with election monitoring organizations such as the Committee of Ukrainian Voters to provide financial and technical assistance to develop election monitoring capabilities. This monitoring played a salient role in popular uprising against electoral fraud during the Orange Revolution.

United States
They are partnered with Gov2U an organization acquired by Scytl.

Venezuela
According to an article in the American socialist magazine Jacobin, after the death of Hugo Chávez, the NDI provided funding and training to the Democratic Unity Roundtable (MUD) coalition of opposition parties in Venezuela. The MUD used the NDI's assistance to create a voter database and target swinging voters through Facebook. In 2015, the opposition won a majority in the Venezuelan National Assembly for the first time since 1999 and the NDI said a "determining factor in the success of the coalition in the parliamentary elections of 2015 was a two-year effort prior to the elections to raise awareness, train and align national and regional structures of communication of all the parties that conform the MUD".

Sources of funding
NDI receives financial support from the National Endowment for Democracy, the US Agency for International Development, the US Department of State, and the Consortium for Elections and Political Process Strengthening. The NDI also receives contributions from governments, foundations, multilateral institutions, corporations, organizations, and individuals. Some of these institutions include the Government of Australia, Government of Denmark, Government of Belgium and the Open Society Foundations.

Awards, events, and honors
Andi Parhamovich Fellowship: In 2007 NDI announced the establishment of the Andi Parhamovich Fellowship, named in honor of NDI staff member Andi Parhamovich, who was killed on January 17, 2007, when her convoy was attacked while returning from a political party training session in Baghdad. Each year, the fellowship brings to Washington, DC, a young woman selected from NDI local staff or partner organizations who is deeply involved in building and consolidating democracy in her own country by advancing the participation of women.
W. Averell Harriman Democracy Award: Each year NDI hosts a dinner to recognize innovators and activists in the field of democracy. At the dinner, NDI presents the W. Averell Harriman Democracy Award, which honors individuals and organizations that have exhibited a sustained commitment to democracy and human rights, and have demonstrated leadership, integrity and courage in their dedication to democratic values and practices.
Past recipients of the award have included: Senator Barbara Mikulski, D-MD; Archbishop Desmond Tutu of South Africa; President Ellen Johnson Sirleaf of Liberia; former United States President Jimmy Carter; former Czech President Václav Havel; former United States President Bill Clinton; Varela Project leader Oswaldo Payá of Cuba; Burmese democratic leader Aung San Suu Kyi; US Ambassador to the United Nations, Madeleine Albright; and Tunisians Yassine Brahim, Rafik Halouani, Wafa Makhlouf, and Sayida Ounissi.

Reception
The socialist magazine Monthly Review stated that the terms democracy assistance, democracy building, and democracy promotion are rhetorically employed to overpower nationalist and socialist resistance to US economic and cultural domination, particularly in Russia and nearby states.

The NDI provided funding to the Cambodian opposition party Cambodia National Rescue Party (CNRP) and was expelled from Cambodia in August 2017.

In December 2020 China sanctioned three members of the institute, and said the US "blatantly interferes in Hong Kong affairs and grossly interferes in China’s domestic affairs".

See also
National Endowment for Democracy
International Republican Institute
United States Institute of Peace

References

Further reading

External links
 

1983 establishments in Washington, D.C.
Factions in the Democratic Party (United States)
Organizations established in 1983
Non-profit organizations based in Washington, D.C.
Democratic Party (United States)
National Endowment for Democracy
Undesirable organizations in Russia